The Explorer is a lost 1915 American adventure silent film directed by George Melford and written by W. Somerset Maugham and William C. deMille. The film stars Lou Tellegen, Tom Forman, Dorothy Davenport, James Neill and Horace B. Carpenter. The film was released on September 27, 1915, by Paramount Pictures.

Plot
The film was advertised as a story of an adventurous youth who led an exploration party into Central Africa, risking life and honor for the women he loved.

Cast 
Lou Tellegen as Alec McKenzie
Tom Forman as George Allerton
Dorothy Davenport as Lucy Allerton 
James Neill as Dr. Adamson
Horace B. Carpenter as McInnery

References

External links 
 
 

1915 films
1910s English-language films
American adventure films
Lost American films
1915 adventure films
Paramount Pictures films
Films directed by George Melford
American black-and-white films
American silent feature films
Films set in Africa
1915 lost films
Lost adventure films
1910s American films
Silent adventure films